is a major Buddhist temple in the historic Asuka area of Nara Prefecture, Japan.

It was founded by Priest  during the 7th century, and is the 7th temple on the Kansai Kannon Pilgrimage. The statue of Gien is one of the national treasures of Japan. At the heart of the temple is Japan's largest clay image, a Nyoirin Kannon from the 8th century.

The temple can be accessed from either Okadera Station or Asuka Station on Kintetsu Yoshino Line, or by car on Route 169. Note if visiting by train that the temple is several kilometers from either of these stations, in the hills to the east of Asuka-mura.

References

External links

 Okadera Temple - Saigoku Kannon Pilgrimage
 Okadera

Buddhist temples in Nara Prefecture
Important Cultural Properties of Japan
Historic Sites of Japan